In Greek mythology, Apis (Ancient Greek: Ἄπις derived from apios "far-off" or "of the pear-tree") was the fourth king of Sicyon who reigned for 25 years.

Family 
Apis was the son and heir of King Telchis, descendant of the city's founder Aegialeus. He was the father of Thelxion who succeeded him in the throne. Apis belonged to a legacy of primeval kings of Sicyon which is as follows: Aegialeus – Europs – Telchis – Apis – Thelxion – Agyreus – Thurimachus – Leucippus.

Mythology 
Apis reached such a height of power before Pelops came to Olympia that all the territory south of the Isthmus was called after him Apia. This was also attributed to his Argive namesake who have had Peloponnesus named Apia after him.

Notes

References 

 Pausanias, Description of Greece with an English Translation by W.H.S. Jones, Litt.D., and H.A. Ormerod, M.A., in 4 Volumes. Cambridge, MA, Harvard University Press; London, William Heinemann Ltd. 1918. . Online version at the Perseus Digital Library
 Pausanias, Graeciae Descriptio. 3 vols. Leipzig, Teubner. 1903. Greek text available at the Perseus Digital Library.

Princes in Greek mythology
Mythological kings of Sicyon
Kings in Greek mythology
Sicyonian characters in Greek mythology